The Mineral Mountains are a group of rugged, volcanic hills and mountains southwest of Superior and northeast of Florence in Pinal County, Arizona.

The White Canyon Wilderness Area is in the eastern portion of this range.

References

Mountain ranges of the Sonoran Desert
Mountain ranges of Pinal County, Arizona
Mountain ranges of Arizona